Tanner James Maguire (born July 15, 1998) is an American child actor. He appears in the film Janie. He is most famous for his roles in Letters to God and, earlier, in Saving Sarah Cain, in which he plays Josiah Cottrell. His sister, Payton Maguire, also acts.

Career
Born in Scottsdale, Arizona, Tanner's interest in acting began at the age of three after a visit to the local community theater to see Peter Pan. By the time he was six, he had gone on to perform in nine different productions on stage. Tanner began to express interest in not only being in front of an audience but also being in front of a camera. His family relocated to Los Angeles and immediately Tanner began to work in television appearing on numerous popular shows, proving the move successful. Maguire has appeared in several national commercials.

Tanner donated an autographed bandanna from the movie Letters to God to Brendan Hogan, a young boy with brain cancer.

Filmography

Awards and nominations

References

External links

1998 births
American male child actors
Living people
Male actors from Scottsdale, Arizona